3 Centauri is a triple star system in the southern constellation of Centaurus, located approximately 300 light years from the Sun. It is visible to the naked eye as a faint, blue-white hued star with a combined apparent visual magnitude of 4.32. As of 2017, the two visible components had an angular separation of  along a position angle of 106°. The system has the Bayer designation k Centauri; 3 Centauri is the Flamsteed designation.  It is a suspected eclipsing binary with a variable star designation V983 Centauri.

The brighter member, designated component A, is a magnitude 4.52 chemically peculiar star of the helium-weak (CP4) variety, and has a stellar classification of B5 III-IVp. The spectrum of the star displays overabundances of elements such as nitrogen, phosphorus, manganese, iron, and nickel, while carbon, oxygen, magnesium, aluminium, sulfur, and chlorine appear underabundant relative to the Sun. Weak emission line features are also visible.

The magnitude 5.97 secondary, component B, is a single-lined spectroscopic binary star system with an orbital period of 17.4 days and an eccentricity of 0.21. The visible component is a B-type main-sequence star with a class of B8 V.

References

B-type main-sequence stars
B-type giants
Triple star systems
Eclipsing binaries
Centaurus (constellation)
Centauri, k
CD-32 9676
Centauri, 3
120709/10
067669
5210/1
Helium-weak stars